La Capella Reial de Catalunya is a group of soloist singers with the aim of making the repertoire of Catalan historical music and, by extension, that of Spanish and other music widely known throughout the world. The group was formed in Barcelona in 1987 by its conductor Jordi Savall. La Capella Reial de Catalunya often performs with Le Concert des Nations, a period instrument group also founded and conducted by Savall.

External links
Artists Management page on La Capella Reial de Catalunya
La Capella Reial de Catalunya – 25 years byLa Capella Reial de Catalunya, Hespèrion XX dir. Jordi Savall

La Capella Reial de Catalunya
Musical groups established in 1987
1987 establishments in Catalonia